The Royal Oak is a 17th-century pub in the village of Hail Weston, Cambridgeshire (historically Huntingdonshire). It is the last remaining pub in the village, which is home to a population of roughly 600 people, and has a long history as a community centre.

History

The Royal Oak is a grade II listed building with a traditional thatched roof. Inside, the exposed beams and posts have been preserved, as well as the fireplace. According to surveyors, it was built at around 1750.

A number of local traditions revolve around the Royal Oak. These include the New Year's Day go-kart contest, where homemade push-karts are raced along the high street.

An Easter Egg hunt is held each year in the pub gardens and the traditional Heartsease group dances around the pub every summer.

In one era an 'onion bowl' was held (a variation on boules). The pub opened its kitchens for competitors to prep their onions and the bowl then took place in the garden. The Royal Oak has also hosted the 'egg dump' - a more dramatic version of conkers using eggs; a charity bike ride (raising funds for Action Medical Research); a fun run; and regular celebrations at national holidays - such as Christmas, Easter and New Year.

In one of the more bizarre turns in the Royal Oak's history, the remains of a cat were uncovered in the cellar walls during renovations. The exact connection the cat had with the pub are unknown. The landlord, Keith Nightingale, speculated it may have been placed there as 'a good luck charm'. The owners at the time opted to restore the cat to its resting place in the wall, where it remains to this day.

For several decades the Royal Oak has enjoyed rumours that it plays host to a ghost. As reported in the Hunts Post newspaper in 1983, some patrons claimed that they could hear bells - and occasionally singing monks - in the bar room chimney.

Community buyout

In November 2011 the Royal Oak was sold by the Charles Wells Pub Company to a private buyer. 6 weeks later, on New Year's Day, the pub was closed and in March 2012 it was put up for auction. It failed to sell and was auctioned again two months later. Once more, it failed to sell.

At the same time, a community group formed - the Hail Weston Community Pub Society (HWCPS) - in the hope of buying the Royal Oak and running it as a community pub.

In late 2012 HWCPS registered the Royal Oak an Asset of Community Value under the newly-passed Localism Act 2011, the first to be registered in Huntingdonshire, and in November 2013 made a formal offer for the Royal Oak.

The offer was not accepted, news which made the front page of local newspaper, the Hunts Post, at the time. HWCPS made another, significantly higher, offer in 2015, but this was also rejected.

In 2016, after several years of negotiations, a group of villagers (and members of HWCPS) got together to make a fresh bid to buy the Royal Oak. On 31 January 2017 a sale finally went through and a grand re-opening was planned for the spring.

Reopening

Renovation and restoration work began in the following weeks with the assistance of around 50 volunteers. The old kitchen was stripped out and the room restored as a bar room. During the works, a pre-Victorian bread oven was discovered in the walls. The bar was rebuilt with reclaimed wood and a new stone floor was laid. At the rear of the pub, in the 1960s era extension, a new kitchen was built from scratch.

On Friday 19 May 2017 the Royal Oak formally reopened.

Present era

The Royal Oak is currently open Wednesday to Sunday. It runs a regular quiz night on Sunday evenings and a bridge night on Thursdays. In the summer, open air film screenings have become a fixture and a series of beer and music festivals have been held in the garden - including the newly-created WestFest, which was held in August 2018 and August 2019.

The Royal Oak won CAMRA's award for 'Most Improved Rural Pub' in Huntingdonshire in October 2017.

See also
Pub names#Royal Oak

References

Pubs in Cambridgeshire
Grade II listed pubs in Cambridgeshire
Thatched buildings in England